Turbulence is a phenomenon involving the irregular motion of air and fluids, studied in fluid dynamics.

Turbulence may also refer to:

Physics and technology 
Clear-air turbulence, a high-altitude aviation hazard
Wake turbulence, forms behind an aircraft as it passes through the air
Wave turbulence, a set of waves deviated far from thermal equilibrium

Movies and TV
Turbulence (U.S. film series)
Turbulence (1997 film), a 1997 action film 
Turbulence 2: Fear of Flying (1999 film) direct-to-video action film
Turbulence 3: Heavy Metal (2001 film) direct-to-video action film
Turbulence (2000 film), a 2000 Brazilian film
Turbulence (2011 film), a 2011 British film
Turbulence (2016), Lifetime Movie Network television film
"Turbulence" (CSI: NY episode)
"Turbulence" (Smallville episode), a season 8 episode of Smallville

Literature
Turbulence (novel), a 2005 children's book by Jan Mark
Turbulence, a 2010 superhero novel by Samit Basu
Turbulence, a novel by Giles Foden

Music
Turbulence (musician) (born 1980), Jamaican reggae musician
Turbulence (Aviator album)
Turbulence (Steve Howe album)
"Turbulence", a song from Warren Zevon's 1989 album, Transverse City
Turbulence, a 2007 album by Monoral
"Turbulence", a single from Bowling for Soup's 2011 album, Fishin' for Woos
"Turbulence" (song), a 2011 song by Laidback Luke, Steve Aoki, and Lil Jon

Other uses
Turbulence.org, an arts organization
Turbulence (NSA), a surveillance and cyberwarfare system
Turbulence, a 2005 proposed roller coaster at Hersheypark in Hershey, Pennsylvania, cancelled before coaster was constructed
Turbulence (roller coaster), a 2015 roller coaster at Adventureland in East Farmingdale, New York